Inspector Notty K is a 2018 Bengali language romantic comedy film, directed by Ashok Pati and produced by Jeet, Nispal Singh, Gopal Madnani, Amit Jumrani, Joydeep Roy Chowdhury and Abdul Aziz. It is a remake of the 2013 Punjabi film Jatt & Juliet 2 starring Diljit Dosanjh. Jeet as the titular character alongside Nusrat Faria, the two starring in their third film together after Badsha – The Don (2016) and Boss 2: Back to Rule (2017).

Cast
 Jeet as Natabar Khara aka Notty K, the would be inspector of Uttarpara Police Station
 Nusrat Faria as Sameera, inspector of Italian police
 Champa Gulshan Ara Akter as Sameera's mother
 Kharaj Mukherjee as Deben Ghosh (OC)
 Supriyo Dutta as Notty K's father
 Pradip Dhar as constable of Uttarpara Police Station
 Biswanath Basu (special appearance)
 Sanghashree Mishra

Production 
The film was announced two months after the release of Boss 2: Back to Rule, and filmed in Bangladesh, Kolkata, Italy and Bangkok.

Release 
The film started as an India-Bangladesh joint production by Jeetz Filmworks and Jaaz Multimedia. Late in shooting, the rules for joint productions changed. Rather than delay the release until a required preview committee was formed, the producers decided to release it as an Indian film, which Jazz Multimedia then imported to Bangladesh.

It was released in India on 19 January 2018 in 130 theatres. Originally intended to release simultaneously in Bangladesh, it was delayed there by one week to 26 January, when it opened in 81 theatres.

Critical reception 
In a review by The Times of India, the film received 2.5 out of 5 stars, saying the film fails to keep the audience entertained due to its weak screenplay and storyline.

Soundtrack

The soundtrack of the film was composed by Suddho Roy & Savvy Gupta. The soundtrack features vocals from Nakash Aziz, Dev Negi, Shweta Pandit, Raj Barman & Sonu Nigam.

References

External links 

2018 films
2010s Bengali-language films
Bengali-language Indian films
Bengali-language Bangladeshi films
Films scored by Savvy Gupta
Films scored by Shuddho Roy
Bengali remakes of Punjabi films
Films shot in Italy
Fictional portrayals of the West Bengal Police
Films directed by Ashok Pati
Jaaz Multimedia films